Paul Ramon Check is a New Zealand political candidate. He is the leader of Outdoor Recreation New Zealand, a party based around the hunting and fishing lobbies.

Check initially worked as a marine engineer in the Royal New Zealand Navy, and then served in the United States Merchant Marine in Brazil. He later worked as an engineer in other parts of Latin America and in New Zealand. He currently manages a company in Taupo.

In the 2002 election, Check was third on Outdoor Recreation New Zealand's list, but the party did not win enough votes to enter Parliament. Later, the party affiliated itself with United Future, a larger party. In the 2005 election, Outdoor Recreation  stood candidates under the United Future banner. Check, as the new leader of Outdoor Recreation, was placed seventh, the highest position for an Outdoor Recreation candidate. He contested the Taupo electorate and achieved 2.06% of the votes.

References

Leaders of political parties in New Zealand
Living people
United Future politicians
Royal New Zealand Navy personnel
People from Taupō
United States Merchant Mariners
Unsuccessful candidates in the 2002 New Zealand general election
Unsuccessful candidates in the 2005 New Zealand general election
Year of birth missing (living people)